Tu Mo Hero is a 2017 Indian Odia drama and romance film released on 20 October 2017. The film stars Jyoti Ranjan Nayak, Jhilik Bhattacharya and Mihir Das in key roles.

Synopsis

Lata and her husband Sambhu get introduced at Salia Sahi in Bhubaneswar. Sambhu and Lata adopt his sister's son Prem.  Prem is the most stylish among the boys which makes Khushi daughter of State Bank manager Abhiji fall in love with him. But her father is against their relationship and wants Khushi to marry the son of a rich builder. Heartbroken, Prem attempts suicide but survives somehow. The rest of the movie conveys how they fight to be together.

Cast 

Jyoti Ranjan Nayak
Jhilik Bhattacharya
Mihir Das
Priyanka Patnaik
Bikash Das
Jaya Biswas
 Guddu
Kalia
 Soumya
Bulu
 Pratibha Sahu
 Jeevan Panda
Dev Sethy
 Chakradhar Jena
Rajani Ranjan
 Rock Patra 
Master Suhana

Soundtrack

Complete soundtrack album was released on 20 October 2017.

References

2017 films
2010s Odia-language films